These Are Soulful Days is an album by organist Don Patterson recorded in 1973 and released on the Muse label.

Reception
Allmusic awarded the album 4 stars with a review stating, "These Are Soulful Days is easily recommendable to fans of classic organ, guitar, sax combos, as well as to listeners who simply enjoy the playing of top-flight jazz musicians who have a healthy respect for the music's blues roots".

Track listing 
All compositions by Don Patterson except as indicated
 "These Are Soulful Days" (Cal Massey) - 8:15   
 "Whistle While You Work" (Frank Churchill, Larry Morey) - 7:30   
 "Skylark" (Johnny Mercer, Hoagy Carmichael) - 9:12   
 "Blue 'n' Boogie" (Dizzy Gillespie, Frank Paparelli) - 4:06   
 "Muse Blues" - 17:55

Personnel 
Don Patterson - organ
Jimmy Heath - tenor saxophone
Pat Martino - guitar
Albert Heath - drums

References 

Don Patterson (organist) albums
1974 albums
Muse Records albums
Albums produced by Don Schlitten